Garni is a village in the Kotayk Province of Armenia.

Garni may also refer to:

 Garni (crater), an impact crater on Mars,
 Garni Gorge
 Temple of Garni, an Ionic temple in Garni, Armenia
 Bouquet garni, a bundle of herbs usually tied together with string and stewed
 Kelly Garni, American hard rock musician and photographer

See also
 Al-Garni, surname